is a passenger railway station in the city of Midori, Gunma, Japan, operated by the third sector railway company Watarase Keikoku Railway.

Lines

Station layout
The station has two opposed side platforms connected by a level crossing. The station building also doubles as the local post office.

Adjacent stations

History
Sōri Station opened on 31 December 1912 as a station on the Ashio Railway. The station building and platform and waiting room were registered by the national government as a national Tangible Cultural Property in 2008.

Surrounding area
 Sōri Post Office
 Sōri International Soccer School

See also
 List of railway stations in Japan

References

External links

 Station information (Watarase Keikoku) 

Railway stations in Gunma Prefecture
Railway stations in Japan opened in 1912
Midori, Gunma
Registered Tangible Cultural Properties